Denys Olehovych Ustymenko (born 12 April 1999) is a Ukrainian professional football player. He plays for Kryvbas Kryvyi Rih (2020).

Club career
He made his Ukrainian Premier League debut for FC Oleksandriya on 27 October 2018 in a game against FC Zorya Luhansk.

International career 
Ustymenko was a part of the Ukraine national U-20 football team, that won the 2019 FIFA U-20 World Cup.

Honours

International

Ukraine U20
FIFA U-20 World Cup: 2019

References

External links
 
 

1999 births
People from Derhachi
Living people
Ukrainian footballers
Ukraine youth international footballers
Association football forwards
FC Oleksandriya players
Ukrainian Premier League players
Sportspeople from Kharkiv Oblast